Lucas Janson (born 16 August 1994) is an Argentine professional footballer who plays as a left winger for Vélez Sarsfield.

Career

Tigre

Toronto FC loan
On August 8, 2018 Janson joined Toronto FC on loan for the remainder of the 2018 Major League Soccer season from Tigre of the Argentine Primera División.

Velez Sarsfield

Career statistics

Honours 
Individual

 Copa Libertadores Team of the Tournament: 2022

References

External links
 

1994 births
Living people
Argentine footballers
Argentine expatriate footballers
Argentine people of British descent
Association football wingers
Argentine Primera División players
Major League Soccer players
Club Atlético Tigre footballers
Toronto FC players
Club Atlético Vélez Sarsfield footballers
Argentine expatriate sportspeople in Canada
Expatriate soccer players in Canada